John Gonzales (born 1955) is a Tewa politician and potter. He is the former President of the National Congress of American Indians, served as a consultant to the first Bush administration, a council member of the Tribal Council of San Ildefonso for eight years, and Governor of San Ildefonso.

References

1955 births
20th-century Native Americans
George H. W. Bush administration personnel
Native American leaders
Native American potters
Tewa people
Living people
People from San Ildefonso Pueblo, New Mexico
20th-century American politicians
20th-century American artists